Streletskoye is a rural locality (a selo) in Krasnogvardeysky District, Belgorod Oblast, Russia. The population was 690 as of 2010. There are 9 streets.

Geography 
Streletskoye is located 10 km northeast of Biryuch (the district's administrative centre) by road. Yamki is the nearest rural locality.

References 

Rural localities in Krasnogvardeysky District, Belgorod Oblast